Bonnie Triyana (born 1979) is an Indonesian historian and museum curator. He is founder, managing director and lead editor of the Indonesian-language history magazine Historia.

Biography
Bonnie Triyana was born in Rangkasbitung, Banten, Indonesia in 1979. He lived in Sumatra for a time, where his father worked as a plantation manager. He studied history at Diponegoro University in Semarang, graduating with a bachelor's degree in 2003. In that same year he co-edited (with Budi Setiyono) a new book of speeches by former Indonesian president Sukarno.

Inspired by the Brazilian popular history magazine Istoria, Triyana founded the monthly Indonesian-language history magazine Historia. It began as a website in 2010 and was launched as a print edition in 2012. Since then he has been sought out for opinion on historical matters in the Indonesian press; for example, in 2014 his opposition to former Indonesian president Suharto being declared a National Hero of Indonesia (a proposal by then-presidential candidate Prabowo Subianto).

He was involved in a group which successfully advocated in 2012 for the restoration of a former Sarekat Islam school in Semarang which had fallen into disrepair, due to its historical significance to the anti-colonial movement in the Dutch East Indies.

In early 2022 he was a guest curator of an exhibition on the Indonesian National Revolution at the Rijksmuseum in Amsterdam. His participation became controversial in the Netherlands when, in a column in the Dutch newspaper NRC Handelsblad, he explained his view that the word "Bersiap" should be dropped from the exhibit, saying that the use of the term in the exhibit would oversimplify the narrative in the exhibit and reinforce stereotypes of violent, barbaric Indonesians. The Federation of Dutch Indonesians filed a complaint to the Dutch police about the matter in January 2022, accusing Triyana of stigmatizing Indonesian and Dutch survivors of that historical period and downplaying the violence against them. The police decided not to pursue the charges, while the Rijksmuseum continued to use the term in the exhibit and noted that Triyana had been expressing his personal opinion in the editorial.

On 23 May 2022, he appeared in front of the Dutch standing committee on Foreign Affairs at the House of Representatives to present an Indonesian perspective on the violence which took place during the Dutch departure from Indonesia.

Selected publications
  (Ombak, 2005; as co-editor with Budi Setiyono).
  (ISAI/Komunitas Bambu, 2008, co-editor with Max Lane).
  (Kompas, 2010, cowritten with Derom Bangun)(Kompas, 2011)
  (Kompas, 2011)
  (Historia, 2013, as editor)

References 

Indonesian historians
People from Banten
1979 births
Living people
Indonesian magazine editors